Polish Cultural Institute in London - Polish cultural institution in the capital of the United Kingdom under the Ministry of Foreign Affairs of Poland.

Activities 
The main purpose of the Institute is to fulfil the tasks of public diplomacy, i.e. to maintain good social, scientific and cultural relations between Poland and Great Britain. The Institute organizes exhibitions, concerts, film screenings, book promotions, book translations, coordinates scientific and cultural exchange. The aim of the Institute is to disseminate knowledge about Poland: culture, art, science, history, economy, politics, sociology. The Institute's activity is also partly directed to the Polish community in the United Kingdom.

The Institute was established in 1938, but the first director was appointed 10 years later. From 2014, its seat is located on 10 Bouverie Street. Before that, it was located at 52-53 Poland Street. Previously, it was located at 34 Portland Place and 16 Devonshire Street. During the communist era, the Institute was boycotted by the British and the Polish community. Since 2003 the Institute has been organizing the Polish Film Festival "Kinoteka".

Directors 

 1948–1951 – Antoni Słonimski
 1962–1964 – Tadeusz Wujek
 1964–1969 – Osman Achmatowicz
 1969–1972 – Grzegorz Leopold Seidler
 1972-1974 – Tadeusz Cieślak
 1974–1978 – Ernest Bryll
 1979–1985 – Irena Gabor-Jatczak
 1985–1993 –  Karol Drozd
 1993–1997 – Hanna Mausch
 1998–1999 – Aleksandra Czapiewska, Elżbieta Łyszkowska, Barbara Kościelny p.o.
 2000–2001 – Joanna Wróblewska
 2002–2005 – Joanna Stachyra
 2005–2009 – Paweł Potoroczyn
 2009–2013 – Roland Chojnacki
 2013–2016 – Anna Godlewska
 2016–2019 – Robert Szaniawski
 od 1 lipca 2019 – Marta de Zuniga

See also 

 The Embassy of the Republic of Poland in London
 Polish Institute and Sikorski Museum
 Polish Social and Cultural Association
 Polish Hearth Club

References

External links 
 Official Website

Cultural organisations based in the United Kingdom
Polish culture
Polish diaspora in the United Kingdom